Kalangani is a village in Namakkal district, Tamil Nadu, India, located on the National Highway NH 7, 11 km before Namakkal on the Salem to Namakkal route.  The population was 3,916 at the 2011 Indian census.

There is one Government higher secondary school (ADW). It is very helpful for surrounding village students.

References

Villages in Namakkal district